is a Japanese actress and singer. She has voiced many different types of characters, from young girls to adult women, as well as boys and animals. Her roles include leads such as Ryuko Matoi in Kill la Kill, Kallen Stadtfeld in Code Geass, Nadja Applefield in Ashita no Nadja, Leonmitchelli Galette Des Rois in Dog Days, Yumi Hoshino in KimiKiss: Pure Rouge, Takuto Hasegawa in Magician's Academy, Hibiki Hojo in Suite PreCure, Nanaka Yatsushiro in Myself ; Yourself, Himari Noihara in Omamori Himari, Sailor Jupiter in Sailor Moon Crystal, Mikumo Guynemer in Macross Delta, Nodoka Haramura in Saki, Tenma Tsukamoto in School Rumble, Holo in Spice and Wolf, and Yang Xiao Long in both Rwby (Japanese Dub) and RWBY: Ice Queendom. In video games, she voiced notable characters like Agnès Oblige in Bravely Default, Ibuki Mioda in Danganronpa, Mai Shiranui since KOF Sky Stage, Mist in Rune Factory, Rimurisu in Tears to Tiara, Rinka in the Atelier series, Rosa Ushiromiya in both Umineko: When They Cry and Umineko: Golden Fantasia, Tsuruhime in Sengoku Basara, Yukiko Amagi in Persona 4, Beidou (Hokuto in Japanese) in Genshin Impact (Japanese Dub), and Projekt Red in Arknights. She also is known for her dubbing role for Thailand films which starred Yanin Vismitananda.

Career
At the age of 12, Koshimizu joined Theater Company Wakakusa. In the second year of junior high school, she was over 160 cm tall and was troubled by the fact that she could not get roles as a child actor. Influenced by her senior in the troupe, Mayumi Iizuka, she began to aspire to become a voice actor. In 2003, she passed an audition for Ashita no Nadja and made her voice acting debut as the lead Nadja Applefield. She continued her career with roles in School Rumble (as Tenma Tsukamoto), Onegai My Melody (as Miki Sakurazuka), and Eureka Seven (as Anemone).

In 2007, she won the 1st Seiyu Awards for Best Actress in a supporting role for her role as Kallen Stadtfeld in Code Geass, and in 2011, she starred in Suite PreCure (Hibiki Hojo/Cure Melody) for the second time since her debut in the 8:30 - 9:00 Sunday slot produced by Asahi Broadcasting Corporation. She also visited Anime Expo as a guest of honor to promote Kill la Kill as Ryuko Matoi.

On September 30, 2011, Koshimizu left Production Baobab, where she had belonged for four years, and joined Axlone on October 1, 2011. On February 28, 2018, she left Axlone and announced that she would be working as a freelancer.  On January 7, 2022, she announced that she will be under her own agency, Office Restart.

Filmography

Animation

Film

Video games

Audio performances

Dubbing roles

Live-action

Animation

Discography

Albums

Character singles and albums

Video albums

References

External links
  
 
 
 

1986 births
Living people
Japanese musical theatre actresses
Japanese stage actresses
Japanese video game actresses
Japanese voice actresses
Japanese women pop singers
Nippon Columbia artists
Production Baobab voice actors
Singers from Tokyo
Voice actresses from Tokyo Metropolis
21st-century Japanese actresses
21st-century Japanese women singers
21st-century Japanese singers